The Living and the Dead is a 2007 Croatian action horror film directed by Kristijan Milić.

It tells the story of Bosnian Croat (HVO) fighters who, while fighting in the Croat–Bosniak War (1992–1994), face something not entirely of this world. The film was released in 2007. It was filmed in Bosnia and Herzegovina, at a small town known as Prozor-Rama.
In 2007, the film won the Big Golden Arena for Best Film at the Pula Film Festival.

Plot
In 1943, group of Croatian soldiers overtake a strategically important point in western Bosnia with a goal to destroy a group of communist partisans. On the way they met some supernatural phenomena, and the action itself went very badly because the partisans ambushed them. The main character Martin inherits silver cigarette case from a dying soldier. This act connects to the story in 1993 when we meet Martins grandson Tomo. He is one of six soldiers of the Croatian army who have come to the same place in Bosnia to meet the same phenomena and similar fate.

Cast
 Filip Šovagović - Tomo / Martin
 Velibor Topić - Vijali
 Slaven Knezović - Coro
 Marinko Prga - Mali
 Borko Perić - Robe
 Miro Barnjak - Ivo
 Božidar Orešković - Zapovjednik
 Enes Vejzović - Ferid / Vojnik ARBIH u kolibi
 Izudin Bajrović - Stojan
 Ljubomir Jurković - Semin
 Robert Roklicer - Satnik Dane Boro
 Zvonko Zečević - Natporucnik Knez
 Dragan Suvak - Streljani Partizan
 Nino Soric - Pejo

Release

Home media
The film was released on DVD in the United States by TLA Releasing on 25 March 2008. It was later released by DNC on 19 May that same year.

References

Further reading
 Živi i mrtvi

External links
 
 
 

2007 films
2007 horror films
Bosnia and Herzegovina war films
Films set in Bosnia and Herzegovina
Films shot in Bosnia and Herzegovina
2000s Croatian-language films
Bosnian War films
Croatian war films
Films based on Croatian novels
Horror war films